Driven is the lead single from the album Alpha by American rock band Sevendust. "Driven" was the band's highest charting single (matched only by "Enemy"), peaking at #10 on the Mainstream Rock Charts, and since surpassed only by "Unraveling", which peaked at #7.

Music video
The music video, which was shot in Haverhill, Massachusetts during the band's rehearsal for their 2007 tour, features rare behind-the-scenes footage of the band's members as they prepare material from their sixth album Alpha. The video debuted nationwide on March 3 and was featured on the "Headbangers Ball" program on cable channel MTV2 on March 10.

Appearances
The song appeared in the 2007 THQ video game WWE SmackDown vs. Raw 2008 and also another song from this album Feed was in the game. Also "Driven" featured in a promo for the WWE film The Condemned.

Charts

References

2007 singles
Sevendust songs
Songs written by Morgan Rose
Songs written by John Connolly (musician)
Asylum Records singles
2007 songs
Songs written by Vinnie Hornsby
Songs written by Lajon Witherspoon